Olszewnica Stara  is a village in the administrative district of Gmina Wieliszew, within Legionowo County, Masovian Voivodeship, in east-central Poland.

In the late 19th century, the village had a population of 390.

References

Villages in Legionowo County